Rutherglen Maternity Hospital was a women and children's hospital in Stonelaw Road, Rutherglen, South Lanarkshire, Scotland.

History
Until the 1970s, maternity services in Rutherglen were provided at the Duke Street Hospital. The foundation stone for the new hospital was laid by a gynaecologist, Sir Hector McLennan, in June 1973. The new building was designed by Frank Campbell. The local member of parliament, Gregor Mackenzie, welcomed the first babies born there in 1978 and it was officially opened by Princess Alexandra on 18 May 1979. After 56,000 babies had been born there, it closed on 1 August 1998.

References

Hospitals in South Lanarkshire
1978 establishments in Scotland
Hospitals established in 1978
Hospital buildings completed in 1978
1998 disestablishments in Scotland
Defunct hospitals in Scotland
Maternity hospitals in the United Kingdom
Hospitals disestablished in 1998